Video Demons Do Psychotown (also known as Bloodbath in Psycho Town) is a 1989 horror film written and co-directed by Alessandro De Gaetano and starring Ron Arragon, Donna Baltran, Dave Elliott, Pam Martin, and Myra Taylor. It was distributed by Troma Entertainment.

Premise
Two film students visit a spooky old town for the purpose of filming a documentary. Things in the town are not what they seem and before they know it, they are the next target of a mysterious hooded serial killer.

External links
 

1989 films
1989 horror films
American independent films
Troma Entertainment films
Films directed by Alessandro De Gaetano
1980s English-language films
1980s American films